Edward Lamonte Franklin (January 16, 1928 – July 31, 1975), better known as Guitar Pete Franklin, was an American blues singer, musician and songwriter. His best known track was "Guitar Pete's Blues".

Franklin variously worked with a number of fellow blues musicians including St. Louis Jimmy Oden, Jazz Gillum, John Brim, Sunnyland Slim, and Tampa Red.

Biography
Edward Lamonte Franklin was born in Indianapolis, Indiana. Despite being billed as "Guitar Pete Franklin", he was equally adept on the piano. His guitar work was influenced by the work of Scrapper Blackwell, whilst on the piano his style was similar to his mother's one time lodger, Leroy Carr.

A versatile and accomplished musician, Franklin was able to adapt to electric blues, and provided backing to many musicians.  His first recording took place in 1947, when he accompanied St. Louis Jimmy Oden on guitar for the latter's single "Coming Up Fast". Franklin's own work started in 1949 with his single release, "Casey Brown Blues". Franklin's other duties included making recordings with Jazz Gillum, John Brim, Sunnyland Slim, and Tampa Red.

In 1963, Bluesville Records released The Blues of Pete Franklin: Guitar Pete's Blues, which was recorded on July 12, 1961 in Indianapolis. The album contained Franklin's most famous song "Guitar Pete's Blues".

Franklin died in Indianapolis, Indiana, in July 1975 from a heart disease, aged 47.

Discography

Album

Single

References

External links
Illustrated discography at Wirz.de

1928 births
1975 deaths
American blues guitarists
American male guitarists
American blues pianists
American male pianists
American blues singers
20th-century African-American male singers
Songwriters from Indiana
Musicians from Indianapolis
20th-century American singers
20th-century American guitarists
20th-century American pianists
Guitarists from Indiana
Electric blues musicians
20th-century American male singers
African-American songwriters
African-American pianists
African-American guitarists
American male songwriters